Minusinsk is a historical town in Krasnoyarsk Krai, Russia. Population:    44,500 (1973).

Geography
Minusinsk marks the center of the Minusinsk Hollow, one of the most important archaeological areas north of Pazyryk. It is associated with the Afanasevo, Tashtyk, and Tagar cultures—all of them named after settlements in the vicinity of Minusinsk.

History
"About 330-200 B.C. the iron age triumphed at Minusinsk, producing spiked axes, partly bronze and partly iron, and a group of large collective burial places."  Greco-Roman funerary masks, like those found at Pazyryk, make up the "Minusinsk group: at Trifonova, Bateni, Beya, Kali, Znamenka, etc."  "The Indo-European aristocracy with its Sarmatian connections was succeeded at Minusinsk by the Kirghiz after the third century A.D."

The Russian settlement of Minyusinskoye was founded in 1739-1740 at the confluence of the Minusa River with the Yenisei. The Turkic Min Usa means "my brook", or "thousand rivers". The name transformed to Minusinskoye in 1810.

By 1822, Minusinsk had emerged as a regional center of farming and transit trade and was granted town status. During the 19th century, it was a node of cultural activities for a very large area. The Martyanov Natural History Museum was opened there in 1877. It is still very active and publishes a quite useful annual report of its scientific findings, meetings, etc.

The town was also a place of political exile. George Kennan wrote in his very influential book Siberia and the Exile System (NY 1891) of the town and the museum being an intellectual haven for those tsarist political activists and revolutionaries who had been exiled from European Russia in the 1880s. Vladimir Lenin used to visit Minusinsk on numerous occasions when he was in exile in the nearby village of Shushenskoye between 1897 and 1900. In November 1918, during the Russian Civil War, Minusinsk peasants started a short-lived rebellion against the White Army because of extortion and high taxes. However, poor equipment and supplies led to eventual defeat in the December, and the rebels were subjected to execution, exile, prison or fines.

Administrative and municipal status
Within the framework of administrative divisions, Minusinsk serves as the administrative center of Minusinsky District, even though it is not a part of it. As an administrative division, it is, together with the urban-type settlement of Zelyony Bor, incorporated separately as the krai town of Minusinsk—an administrative unit with the status equal to that of the districts. As a municipal division, the krai town of Minusinsk is incorporated as Minusinsk Urban Okrug.

Climate
Minusinsk has a humid continental climate (Köppen climate classification Dfb/Dwb), with very cold winters and warm summers. Precipitation is quite low, but is much higher from June to September than at other times of the year.

Twin towns and sister cities

Minusinsk is twinned with:
 Norilsk, Russia

Culture
Minusinsk Drama Theater
Established in 1882 as an amateur theatrical society, the Minusinsk Drama Theater was known as the "Sovtheater" from 1920 to 1930. The theater building was constructed on the initiative of the exiled Kon F.Y. and funded mainly by the fire society. In the beginning, the theater was on the second floor and the fire department took up the first floor. The modern Minusinsk Drama Theater performs in this building until today. 
Milestones in the theater performances were 'Vasilisa Melentyeva' by Alexander Ostrovsky, 'Tsar Fyodor Ivanovich' by Alexey Tolstoy,  'Death Squadron' by A. Korneichuk, 'Destiny' by Petr Proskurin, 'Is Not Listed' by Boris Vasiliev. A performance of Alexei Cherkasov's drama “Hop” won the Stanislavsky State Prize.
The Martyanov Natural History Museum (Museum of Local Lore) 
The main attraction of the town is The Martyanov Natural History Museum. Based in 1877, it is one of the oldest in Siberia  and first museum in the Yenisei's guberniya (province).
Museum of Decembrists in Minusinsk
Memorial building of Krzhizhanovsky and Starkov
Minusink Art Gallery 
Museum "Automobiles And Motor Vehicles Of The Soviet Union"

References

Notes

Sources

Cities and towns in Krasnoyarsk Krai
Minusinsk Urban Okrug
Yeniseysk Governorate
Populated places established in 1739
1739 establishments in the Russian Empire
Populated places on the Yenisei River